Jonathan Elman Hadra (born 1982) is an American baseball coach and former first baseman. Hadra played college baseball at VMI from 2001 to 2004. He served as head coach of the VMI Keydets (2015–2022).

Playing career
Hadra attended Atlee High School in Mechanicsville, Virginia. Hadra then committed to the Virginia Military Institute, where he was a member of the Keydets baseball team.

Coaching career
After graduation, Hadra spent a year as an assistant at VMI. In 2006, Hadra began working as an assistant at Western Kentucky. After three years at Western Kentucky, he moved on to be an assistant for the Bradley Braves baseball program. After just a single season at Bradley, Hadra returned to VMI as an assistant coach.

In November 2014, VMI head coach Marlin Ikenberry resigned as the head coach, leaving Hadra as the acting head coach. On November 13, 2014, Hadra was named the full-time head coach at VMI. On July 28, 2022, Hadra resigned as the head coach of the Keydets. He had a 146–247 record over 8 seasons as head coach.

Head coaching record

References

External links
VMI Keydets bio

Living people
1982 births
Baseball first basemen
VMI Keydets baseball players
VMI Keydets baseball coaches
Western Kentucky Hilltoppers baseball coaches
Bradley Braves baseball coaches